Malcolm Preston Skilbeck  (22 September 1932 – 17 June 2022) was an Australian educator who worked in educational policy analysis, curriculum, tertiary and secondary education, the teaching profession and educational innovation. Some of this work was done with the Organisation for Economic Co-operation and Development (OECD) and the United Nations Educational, Scientific and Cultural Organization (UNESCO).

Born on 22 September 1932 in Northam, Western Australia, Skilbeck was educated at North Sydney Boys High School. he received his B.A. from University of Sydney, his M.A. from the University of Illinois, and Ph.D. from the University of London. He published many papers, articles, books and reports on academic issues such as curriculum theory and development, educational policy and youth training, in the secondary and tertiary sectors. He authored the books Loving and Studying Nature: Celebrating the Earth Through History, Culture and Education (2021), School Based Curriculum Development and The Vocational Quest; co-authored the Curriculum Reform and the influential survey Industry-university partnerships in the curriculum: trends and developments in OECD countries.

In the 2014 Australia Day Honours, Skilbeck was made an Officer of the Order of Australia (AO).

With his first wife, Elizabeth (nee Robbins), he had four children, Ruth, Clare, Paul and Lucy; and with his second wife, Helen Connell, he had one child, Brigit. Skilbeck died at the age of 89 on 17 June 2022.

Positions held
Professor and Dean of Education, University of Ulster, from 1971 to 1975
Consultant Centre for Educational Research and Innovation (CERI) in Paris and as a participant in its European programs
Director of the Australian Curriculum Development Centre from 1976 to 1981 
Director of Studies of the Schools Council for Curriculum and Examinations for England and Wales from 1981 to 1983
Professor of Curriculum Studies at the Institute of Education, University of London, from 1981 to 1985
Vice-chancellor and president, Deakin University, Australia, from 1986 to 1991
Deputy Director for Education of the Directorate for Education, Employment, Labour and Social Affairs in the Organization for Economic Cooperation and Development (OECD) in Paris 
Consultant to UNESCO and the British Council
Fellow of the Academy of Social Sciences in Australia

References

1932 births
2022 deaths
Alumni of the University of London
Academics of the UCL Institute of Education
Academics of Ulster University
Fellows of the Academy of the Social Sciences in Australia
People educated at North Sydney Boys High School
People from Northam, Western Australia